Heliconia acuminata (syn.: Heliconia pearcei Rusby) is a species of plant in the family Heliconiaceae. It is an erect herb, typically growing 1.6 m tall, native to the South American countries of Brazil, French Guiana, Guyana, Suriname, Venezuela, Colombia, Bolivia and Peru. It is also grown as an ornamental plant in other regions.

References

acuminata
Flora of Brazil
Flora of French Guiana
Flora of Guyana
Flora of Suriname
Flora of Venezuela
Flora of Bolivia
Flora of Peru
Garden plants
Plants described in 1831

External links
 Heliconia acuminata observations on iNaturalist